Tales of the Gold Monkey is an American adventure drama television series broadcast in prime time on Wednesday nights by ABC from September 22, 1982, until June 1, 1983. Debuting the year following the release of Raiders of the Lost Ark, the series featured the romance of early aviation, exotic locales, and cliff-hanging action.  Creator Don Bellisario said it was based on the film, Only Angels Have Wings (Howard Hawks, 1939).

Premise and major characters

Set in 1938 in the South Pacific, the series is about an ex-Flying Tigers fighter pilot named Jake Cutter (Stephen Collins). Now the operator of an air cargo delivery service based on the fictional South Seas island Bora Gora, he flies a red and white Grumman Goose called Cutter's Goose. Jake's best friend is his mechanic Corky (Jeff MacKay), a good-hearted alcoholic with a hazy memory from heavy drinking. However, a one-eyed Jack Russell terrier named Jack, which barks once for "no" and twice for "yes" (or the opposite if it suits him) would dispute just who Jake's best friend really is. Jack wears an eye patch, but used to have a false eye made of opal with a star sapphire centre that Jake lost in a poker game—and refuses to let Jake forget it.

Jake's love interest/U.S. government spy contact is Sarah Stickney White (Caitlin O'Heaney). She sings in the Monkey Bar as a cover for her espionage activities. The Reverend Willie Tenboom (John Calvin), a phony man of the cloth who likes to "bless" the female natives in private "prayer", is in reality a Nazi spy named Willy, with interests in both sides.

"Bon Chance" Louie (played by Ron Moody in the pilot, Roddy McDowall in the series) is the owner of the Monkey Bar and the French magistrate for Bora Gora. Jake's nemesis is the Japanese princess Koji (Marta DuBois), a Dragon Lady type of character who has eyes for Jake. Koji's devoted bodyguard is Todo (John Fujioka), a fierce practitioner of Bushido and loyal to the princess. (Although Calvin, DuBois, and Fujioka were billed on the opening credits of each episode, they actually only appeared on a semi-regular basis in a handful of episodes.)

The title is derived from a gigantic mythical golden statue that is the focal point of the pilot episode, seen only by the viewer at the end of the show. The characters end their search for the statue after finding a substitute brass monkey that is kept at the Monkey Bar for the rest of the series.

History and context

The series was inspired by the 1939 drama film Only Angels Have Wings.

Originally, the series was to be called Tales of the Brass Monkey, but the Heublein company had run a series of magazine ads with exactly that name about a bar in the Far East, with hints of Casablanca intrigue and references to the Kenpeitai; so, to avoid legal difficulties, the name was changed to Gold Monkey. At the end of the pilot episode, it is revealed that the statue at the bar was actually brass and not gold. However, unknown to the characters (and revealed to viewers only just before the end credits), the island where the statue was found does contain a massive structure apparently made of solid gold that does resemble a monkey.  However, a thousand years of neglect had left it covered in vegetation and debris, and it is only exposed by the same volcanic eruption that forces the characters off the island.

As with most of creator Donald P. Bellisario's projects, links exist to his other shows. The most notable is of the character Gandy Dancer (played by William Lucking), an ace pilot treasure hunter who appears in the episodes "Legends Are Forever" and – in flashback form – in "Honor Thy Brother". Although Gandy dies in "Legends Are Forever", Bellisario liked the character enough to adapt him to the present day. The third-season episode "Two Birds of a Feather" of Bellisario's hit Magnum, P.I. has Lucking playing the very similar character of Sam Houston Hunter, also an ace pilot. The episode, which noticeably has little appearance of Magnum or any other regular characters, acted as a backdoor pilot for a proposed spin-off series starring Lucking. However, the series was never picked up, although Bellisario stripped down the 'adventures of an ace pilot' concept and worked it into Airwolf (1984–1986). Jeff MacKay had recurring roles in Magnum, P.I., and later JAG (1995–2005), and Marta DuBois played the role of Magnum's estranged wife Michelle, long-presumed dead, in a story arc that spanned most of that show's run. MacKay and Calvin both went on to play several guest roles in Airwolf; and McDowall, MacKay, Calvin (and stock footage of the Goose) all went on to have guest appearances on the Bellisario series Quantum Leap (1989–1993). Stock footage of the Goose was also used in The A-Team episode "The Island" (season three, episode eight) and in Quantum Leap Episode "Ghost Ship" (season four, episode 16). Additionally, Jake's surname, Cutter, was previously an early working title and character name for that of Magnum, and Bellisario later reused the name "Gushie", who in Gold Monkey was a waiter at the Monkey Bar who used a wheelchair, for a member of the Quantum Leap project team.

Although generally well received in both the United States and overseas (such as the United Kingdom, where it was broadcast on BBC One on Monday evenings), the show was not renewed for another season, mostly due to the ratings not justifying the high cost of production.

This show was an inspiration for the Disney animated series TaleSpin, according to series creators Jymn Magon and Mark Zaslove. It also heavily inspired the ninth season of the animated series Archer, "Danger Island".

A fictional recursion occurs in "The Sultan of Swat" in which – while waiting for the Boeing 314 Pan Am Clipper – Jake is reading a book with a dustcover titled Murder on the Footbridge, which is apparently a key plot reference from the 1941 Alfred Hitchcock movie Suspicion.

Episodes

Home media
Fabulous Films obtained the DVD rights for the complete series for the United Kingdom, Australia and the United States. Release dates are listed below. Shout! Factory released Tales of the Gold Monkey: The Complete Series on Region 1 DVD on June 8, 2010.

All three DVD sets include the same bonus features: original double-length pilot episode; the complete 20-episode series; new 36-minute 'making of' documentary with Stephen Collins (Jake Cutter), Caitlin O'Heaney (Sarah Stickney White), writer/producer Tom Greene, director Harvey Laidman; audio commentaries on five episodes; series synopsis; stills gallery; Caitlin's Original Costume gallery; artifacts gallery; 24-page collector's booklet with episode synopses. The Region 1 and 2 versions have a dedication to "the memory of the late, great Jeff MacKay" printed on the back cover.

Reception

Ratings

Awards and nominations

References

External links

John Kenneth Muir's profile of the show
DVD review of series

Fiction set in 1938
1982 American television series debuts
1983 American television series endings
American action television series
American Broadcasting Company original programming
Aviation television series
English-language television shows
Television shows set in Oceania
Television series by Universal Television
Television series set in the 1930s
Television series set in fictional countries
World War II television drama series
Television series created by Donald P. Bellisario